Glenwood High School is a comprehensive, co-educational and non-denominational school serving the western part of the town of Glenrothes, Fife, Scotland together with communities to the north and west.

History

The building originally opened in 1962 and was fully renovated and extended in 1982. These renovations included adding on a second building known as the H block by pupils and staff. The schools has modern facilities such as a well equipped Library and Information Centre; modern gym facilities including a games hall, gymnasium, swimming pool, fitness suite and dance studio. There are also extensive playing fields and a blaze pitch. There are also purpose built Theatre Arts facilities including a purpose built suite of music rooms and a primary Drama Studio. The school also has eight computer rooms including 2 WiFi rooms (added in 2013).  In February 2008 the school completed works to allow for disabled access by fitting lifts and ramps into the original main block and the H block taking users from the ground floor to the 2nd in the main block, and the ground floor to the 1st floor in the H block with ease.

In 2018 Fife Council announced that the only money they had available for a new school building, which is badly required was to merge the school with Glenrothes High School.  Still to be rubber stamped, it is hoped that the new school will enter planning once nearby Madras College's new building is finished.

House system

The pupils of Glenwood High School are separated into three different houses and each have their own house colour.

The Houses are:

Bishop: Green
Falkland: Yellow
Lomond: Blue

The head boy and head girl are elected by fellow S6 pupils and the Senior Management team. The final two are selected by the previous years head boy and head girl. S3, S4 & S5 pupils can apply to be a prefect by asking the head boy or head girl. Pupils in S6 automatically become part of the prefect team. All prefects are monitored by the S5/S6 year head, sometimes.

References

External links
 Glenwood High School website

Secondary schools in Fife
Educational institutions established in 1962
1962 establishments in Scotland
Glenrothes